Robert Alexander Zárate Ladera (born February 1, 1987) is a Venezuelan professional baseball pitcher who is a free agent. From 2012 through 2013, he pitched for the Hanshin Tigers of Nippon Professional Baseball (spending most of both seasons with Hanshin's Western League ni-gun team).

Career

Toronto Blue Jays
Zárate signed a minor league contract with the Toronto Blue Jays on January 26, 2005. Zárate played for the Blue Jays minor league system through the 2008 season. He began 2009 with the GCL Blue Jays. The Blue Jays released Zárate on April 15, 2009.

Hanshin Tigers
Zárate played for the Hanshin Tigers of Nippon Professional Baseball in 2012. He made his NPB debut on August 5, 2012. He also played the 2013 season for Hanshin before becoming a free agent after the season.

Gunma Diamond Pegasus
Zárate joined the Gunma Diamond Pegasus of Japan's Baseball Challenge League for the 2014 season. He was scouted by the Rays after spending 2014 with the Pegasus.

Tampa Bay Rays
On January 21, 2015, Zárate signed a minor league contract with the Tampa Bay Rays that included an invitation to Spring Training. He elected free agency on November 6, 2015.

Pittsburgh Pirates
On December 7, 2015, Zárate signed a minor league deal with the Pittsburgh Pirates organization that included an invitation to Spring Training. He spent the 2016 season with the Indianapolis Indians before his release on June 13, 2016.

Cleveland Indians
On January 4, 2018, Zarate signed a minor league contract with an invitation to spring training with the Cleveland Indians. He pitched for the Triple-A Columbus Clippers, appearing in 29 games as a reliever and finishing with a 3-1 record, 3.30 ERA, and 40 strikeouts. He was released by the organization on July 23, 2018.

Toros de Tijuana
On July 27, 2018, Zárate signed with the Toros de Tijuana of the Mexican Baseball League.

Leones de Yucatán
He was traded to the Leones de Yucatán on August 15, 2018. He became a free agent following the season. 

On January 28, 2020, Zárate signed with the Rieleros de Aguascalientes of the Mexican League. Zárate did not play in a game in 2020 due to the cancellation of the Mexican League season because of the COVID-19 pandemic. He later became a free agent.

References

External links

1987 births
Living people
Cardenales de Lara players
Charlotte Stone Crabs players
Columbus Clippers players
Dominican Summer League Blue Jays players
Venezuelan expatriate baseball players in the Dominican Republic
Durham Bulls players
Gulf Coast Blue Jays players
Hanshin Tigers players
Leones de Yucatán players
Mexican League baseball pitchers
Nippon Professional Baseball pitchers
Sportspeople from Valencia, Venezuela
Tigres de Aragua players
Toros de Tijuana players
Venezuelan expatriate baseball players in Japan
Venezuelan expatriate baseball players in Mexico
Venezuelan expatriate baseball players in the United States